The following outline is provided as an overview of and topical guide to the U.S. state of Georgia:

Georgia – ninth most populous of the 50 states of the United States of America. Georgia borders the North Atlantic Ocean in the Southeastern United States. Georgia was the fourth of the original 13 states to approve the Constitution of the United States of America on January 2, 1788. Georgia joined the Confederate States of America during the American Civil War from 1861 to 1865, and was readmitted to the Union in 1870.

General reference 

 Names
 Common name: Georgia
 Pronunciation:  
 Official name: State of Georgia
 Abbreviations and name codes
 Postal symbol:  GA
 ISO 3166-2 code:  US-GA
 Internet second-level domain:  .ga.us
 Nicknames
 Peach State (previously used on license plates)

 Empire State of the South — Refers to economic leadership
 Yankee-land of the South: Similarly to the above nickname, "Yankee-land of the South" speaks to industrial and economic development in the south. This nickname may be used in a derogatory sense.
 Goober State — Refers to peanuts, the official state crop.
 Adjectivals: Georgia
 Demonym: Georgian

Geography of Georgia 

 Georgia (U.S. state) is: a U.S. state, a federal state of the United States of America
 Location
 Northern hemisphere
 Western hemisphere
 Americas
 North America
 Anglo America
 Northern America
 United States of America
 Contiguous United States
 Eastern United States
 East Coast of the United States
 Southeastern United States
 South Atlantic States
 Southern United States
 Deep South
 Population of Georgia (U.S. state): 10,711,908 (2020 U.S. Census)
 Area of Georgia (U.S. state):
 Atlas of Georgia (U.S. state)

Places in Georgia 

 Historic places in Georgia (U.S. state)
 Abandoned communities in Georgia (U.S. state)
 Ghost towns in Georgia (U.S. state)
 National Historic Landmarks in Georgia (U.S. state)
 National Register of Historic Places listings in Georgia (U.S. state)
 Bridges on the National Register of Historic Places in Georgia (U.S. state)
 National Natural Landmarks in Georgia
 National parks in Georgia
 State parks in Georgia (U.S. state)

Environment of Georgia 

 Climate of Georgia (U.S. state)
 Natural history of Georgia (U.S. state)
 Geology of Georgia (U.S. state)
 Protected areas in Georgia (U.S. state)
 National Wildlife Refuges in Georgia (U.S. state)
 State forests of Georgia (U.S. state)
 Superfund sites in Georgia (U.S. state)
 Wildlife of Georgia (U.S. state)
 Flora of Georgia (U.S. state)
 List of trees of Georgia (U.S. state)
 Fauna of Georgia (U.S. state)
 Birds of Georgia (U.S. state)
 Mammals of Georgia (U.S. state)
 Reptiles
 Snakes of Georgia (U.S. state)
 Insects
 Butterflies of Georgia (U.S. state)

Natural geographic features of Georgia 
 Rivers of Georgia (U.S. state)

Administrative divisions of Georgia 

 The 159 counties of the state of Georgia
 Municipalities in the state of Georgia
 Cities in the state of Georgia
 Capital of the state of Georgia: Atlanta
 City nicknames in the state of Georgia
 Sister cities of the state of Georgia
 Towns in the state of Georgia
 Unincorporated communities in the state of Georgia
 Census-designated places in the state of Georgia

Demography of Georgia

Government and politics of Georgia 

 Form of government: U.S. state government
 United States congressional delegations from Georgia (U.S. state)
 Georgia (U.S. state) State Capitol
 Elections in Georgia (U.S. state)
 Electoral reform in Georgia (U.S. state)
 Political party strength in Georgia (U.S. state)

Branches of the government of Georgia

Executive branch of the government of Georgia 
Governor of Georgia (U.S. state)
Lieutenant Governor of Georgia (U.S. state)
 Secretary of State of Georgia
 State Treasurer of Georgia (U.S. state)
 State departments
 Georgia (U.S. state) Department of Transportation

Legislative branch of the government of Georgia 

 Georgia General Assembly (bicameral)
 Upper house: Georgia Senate
 Lower house: Georgia House of Representatives

Judicial branch of the government of Georgia 

Courts of Georgia
 Supreme Court of Georgia

Law and order in Georgia 

 Adoption in Georgia (U.S. state)
 Cannabis in Georgia (U.S. state)
 Capital punishment in Georgia (U.S. state)
 Individuals executed in Georgia (U.S. state)
 Constitution of Georgia (U.S. state)
 Crime in Georgia (U.S. state)
 Organized crime in Georgia (U.S. state)
 Gun laws in Georgia (U.S. state)
 Law enforcement in Georgia (U.S. state)
 Law enforcement agencies in Georgia (U.S. state)
 Georgia (U.S. state) State Police
 Prisons in Georgia (U.S. state)
 Same-sex marriage in Georgia (U.S. state)

Military in Georgia 

 Georgia (U.S. state) Air National Guard
 Georgia (U.S. state) Army National Guard

Local government in Georgia

History of Georgia
 History of Georgia
 Timeline of Georgia

History of Georgia, by period 

Prehistory of the state of Georgia
Spanish colony of Florida, 1565–1763
French colony of Louisiane, 1699–1763
British Colony of Georgia, 1732–1755
History of slavery in Georgia
King George's War, 1739–1748
Treaty of Aix-la-Chapelle of 1748
French and Indian War, 1754–1763
Treaty of Fontainebleau of 1762
Treaty of Paris of 1763
British Province of Georgia, 1755–1776
British Indian Reserve, 1763–1783
Royal Proclamation of 1763
American Revolutionary War, April 19, 1775 – September 3, 1783
United States Declaration of Independence, July 4, 1776
Treaty of Paris, September 3, 1783
State of Georgia, since 1776
Fifth state to ratify the Articles of Confederation and Perpetual Union, signed July 9, 1778
Cherokee–American wars, 1776–1794
Fourth State to ratify the Constitution of the United States of America on January 2, 1788
Treaty of San Lorenzo of 1795
Western territorial claims sold 1802
War of 1812, June 18, 1812 – March 23, 1815
Treaty of Ghent, December 24, 1814
Creek War, 1813–1814
Trail of Tears, 1830–1838
Mexican–American War, April 25, 1846 – February 2, 1848
Fifth state to declare secession from the United States of America on January 19, 1861
Founding state of the Confederate States of America on February 8, 1861
American Civil War, April 12, 1861 – May 13, 1865
Georgia in the American Civil War
Battle of Chickamauga, September 19–20, 1863
Atlanta Campaign, May 7 – September 2, 1864
Battle of Atlanta, July 22, 1864
Franklin–Nashville Campaign, October 5 – December 25, 1864
Sherman's March to the Sea, November 15 – December 21, 1864
Georgia during Reconstruction, 1865–1870
Eleventh former Confederate state readmitted to the United States of America on July 15, 1870
Civil Rights Movement from December 1, 1955, to January 20, 1969
Martin Luther King Jr. awarded Nobel Peace Prize on December 10, 1964
Jimmy Carter becomes 39th President of the United States on January 20, 1977

History of Georgia, by region 
 History of Atlanta
 History of Augusta, Georgia
 History of Brunswick, Georgia
 History of Savannah, Georgia

History of Georgia, by subject 

 History of marriage in Georgia (U.S. state)
 Natural history of Georgia (U.S. state)
 History of slavery in Georgia (U.S. state)
 History of universities in Georgia
 History of Georgia Tech
 History of North Georgia College and State University

Culture of Georgia 

 Cuisine of Georgia (U.S. state)
 Museums in Georgia (U.S. state)
 Religion in the State of Georgia
 The Church of Jesus Christ of Latter-day Saints in Georgia (U.S. state)
 Episcopal Diocese of Georgia (U.S. state)
 Georgia District Church of the Nazarene
 Scouting in Georgia (U.S. state)
 State symbols of Georgia
 Flag of the State of Georgia 
 Great Seal of the State of Georgia

The arts in Georgia 
 Music of Georgia (U.S. state)
 Theater in Georgia (U.S. state)

Sports in Georgia 

 Professional sports teams in Georgia (U.S. state)

Economy and infrastructure of Georgia 

 Communications in Georgia (U.S. state)
 Newspapers in Georgia (U.S. state)
 Radio stations in Georgia (U.S. state)
 Television stations in Georgia (U.S. state)
 Energy in Georgia (U.S. state)
 Health care in Georgia (U.S. state)
 Hospitals in Georgia (U.S. state)
 Transportation in Georgia (U.S. state)
 Bicycle routes in Georgia (U.S. state)
 Airports in Georgia (U.S. state)
 Rail transport in Georgia (U.S. state)
 Roads in Georgia (U.S. state)
 U.S. Highways in Georgia (U.S. state)
 Interstate Highways in Georgia (U.S. state)
 State highways in Georgia (U.S. state)
 Water in Georgia (U.S. state)

Education in Georgia 

 Schools in Georgia (U.S. state)
 School districts in Georgia (U.S. state)
 High schools in Georgia (U.S. state)
 Private schools in Georgia (U.S. state)
 Colleges and universities in Georgia (U.S. state)
 University of Georgia
 Georgia Institute of Technology
 University of West Georgia

See also

Topic overview:
Georgia (U.S. state)

Index of Georgia (U.S. state)-related articles

References

External links 

Georgia
Georgia